Pabása ng Pasyón (Tagalog for "Reading of the Passion"), known simply as Pabása is a Catholic devotion in the Philippines popular during Holy Week involving the uninterrupted chanting of the Pasyón, an early 16th-century epic poem narrating the life, passion, death, and resurrection of Jesus Christ. The verses are based on the bible and practiced every holy week.

Description
Readers are usually groups of individuals taking turns in chanting verses from the book known as the Pasyon, as a devotion made in fulfilment of a panatà (this may be a vow, votive offering in request, or thanksgiving). The modern-day Pabasa may be chanted a cappella or with the accompaniment of musical instruments such as the guitar, accordion, piano, or by a rondalla ensemble. 

There are two common styles of chanting, the first of which is the alternate singing of two persons or two groups of people. The second method has each chanter or group of chanters taking turns in singing the stanzas.

Origins
Before evolving into the contemporary ritual, early forms of the Pabasa were introduced to the various indigenous peoples of the archipelago by Spanish friars spreading the Roman Catholic faith. Over the period of Spanish colonial rule from the late 16th century until 1898, indigenous Filipinos adapted the religious chanting of the Spanish priests and incorporated it to the ancient custom of singing epics during celebrations. The vocal singing style has in many ways, preserved the pre-Hispanic singing techniques of the main groups of the country, like the Tagalog, Ilocano and Visayan ethnic groups.

Duration
The reading and chanting ritual, which is more common in rural areas, may be sponsored by local religious organisations. The Pabasa is done continuously day and night and usually lasts for three consecutive days. The Pabasa may begin on Palm Sunday or Holy Monday, the second day of Holy Week; or it may also start in the afternoon of Maundy Thursday.  The pabasa usually ends on Good Friday on 12 noon or before 3:00 PM PHT (GMT+8) – the traditional hour of Jesus' death on the cross.

See also
Gregorian chant 
Saint Roch 
Obando fertility rites

References

External links
 Listen to a recording of the Pasyón in 21 parts

Holy Week
Epic poetry
Holy Week in the Philippines
Philippine poetry
Philippine songs
Catholic Church in the Philippines